Christopher Lawrence Batt (born 17 February 1956) is a former Australian politician. Batt was born in Hobart, Tasmania; he was the nephew of Neil Batt, who later served as Tasmanian Deputy Premier. He contested the 1986 state election as a Labor candidate for Lyons, but was not successful. However, in 1987 he was elected in a countback following the resignation of Labor MLA Darrel Baldock. Batt held his seat until he was defeated at the 1989 state election.

References

1956 births
Living people
Australian Labor Party members of the Parliament of Tasmania
Members of the Tasmanian House of Assembly